Henne may refer to:

People
 Albert Leon Henne (1901–1967), American chemist
 Chad Henne (born 1985), American football quarterback
 Diedrich Henne (1834–1903), German born botanist and plant collector
 Ernst Jakob Henne (1904–2005), German motorcycle racer and racecar driver
 Fred W. Henne, labour leader and politician
 Frances E. Henne (1906–1985), American librarian
 Henry Henne (1918–2002), Norwegian linguist
 Josef Anton Henne (1798–1870), Swiss historian and politician active during the formative phase of modern Switzerland
 Jan Henne (born 1947), American former competition swimmer
 Michael Henne (born 1961), member of the Ohio House of Representatives
 Otto Henne am Rhyn (1828–1914), Swiss writer
 Rolf Henne (1901–1966), Swiss politician who supported a form of Nazism
 Rudolf Henne (1913–1962), Bomber Ace in the German Luftwaffe during WW II

Other uses
 Henne (magazine), a Norwegian women's magazine
 Henne (river), of North Rhine-Westphalia, Germany
 Kleine Henne, a river of North Rhine-Westphalia, Germany
 Haine (German name Henne), a river in southern Belgium and northern France
 Henne Jewelers, a jewelry store in Pittsburgh
 Robert Henne House, located in the West End of Davenport, Iowa, United States
 Kalitharu Henne, a 1963 Indian Kannada film
 Fred Henne Territorial Park, in the Northwest Territories of Canada